Another Joyous Occasion is the second live album released by the Athens, GA based band Widespread Panic. It was recorded over the Summer and Fall of 1999 when the band performed shows  accompanied by The Dirty Dozen Brass Band. It was the first release on the band's own label, Widespread Records, after leaving Capricorn Records. It was released on June 6, 2000.

The album reached a peak position of #161 on the Billboard 200 chart.

Track listing
All songs by Widespread Panic unless otherwise noted.

Personnel
Widespread Panic
John Bell - guitar, vocals
Michael Houser - guitar, vocals
Todd Nance - percussion, drums, vocals
Domingo S. Ortiz - percussion
Dave Schools - bass, percussion, vocals
John Hermann - keyboards

John Keane - banjo, pedal steel, keyboards, producer, engineer, mixing
The Dirty Dozen Brass Band
Brad Blettenberg - assistant engineer
Billy Field - mixing
Dan Friedman - assistant engineer
Richard Knox - keyboards
Ken Love - mastering
Michael Sheehan - photography
Thomas G. Smith - photography

References

External links
Widespread Panic website
Everyday Companion
[ All Music entry]

2000 live albums
Widespread Panic live albums
Albums produced by John Keane (record producer)